Naiot Venture accelerator was  a technological Incubator, engaged in early seed startup investments. It was based in Yokneam, Israel.

Naiot is a full subsidiary of the Ofer Hi-Tech Group, the venture capital investment arm of the Ofer Brothers Group. Naiot invests and creates value by providing management, as well as the human and financial resources required to nurture seeds concept into sustainable companies.

Investment portfolio focuses primary on Medical devices, along with  information technology, enterprise software and web applications.

Naiot screens over 350 project applications every year, from which it invests in 4 to 6 new projects annually, with $500k-$1M invested in each project. The investments is leveraged through an agreement with the Israeli Chief Scientist's Office and the OCS Technology Incubation Programs (TIP).

History

Since its foundation in 1997, Naiot has launched over 60 companies, which have raised over $300M in funding. 80% of the companies that have graduated up until today raised funds of $500,000 or more.

Naiot's varied deal flow origins include entrepreneurs, who approach Naiot with their innovative projects as well as strategic alliances formed with Medical and Academic Tech Transfers, VCs,  and IT and medical market leaders.

Successful graduates of The Naiot Venture Accelerator include: cardiovascular balloon developer  Angioslide, biofunctional ingredients supplements company Enzymotec Ltd., CorAssist Cardiovascular Ltd., catheter device developer Endocross Ltd., retractor maker EZ Surgical Ltd., stem cell company  Multi Gene Vascular Systems Ltd. (MGVS), Rimon Medical Ltd., which was sold to Boston Scientific for $135 million and MentorWave (Quiksee) which was acquired by Google.

Awards
Naiot has been the winner of Best Israeli Technology Incubator award seven times, of which  five years were in a row, "for its distinguished achievements in promoting early stage ventures".

See also
List of business incubators

References

External links
Naiot Venture Accelerator website (archive)

Venture capital firms of Israel
Investment companies of Israel
Business incubators of Israel